Brouard is a surname. Notable people with the surname include:

Carl Brouard (1902–1965), Haitian poet
Matthieu Brouard (died 1576), Swiss Protestant minister
Régis Brouard (born 1967), French footballer and manager
Santiago Brouard (1919–1984), Basque politician
Yohann Ndoye Brouard (born 2000), French swimmer